Gholamreza Soleimani is a senior officer in the Islamic Revolutionary Guard Corps who commands Basij forces.

Despite the same surname, he is not related to Qassem Soleimani.

On 12 April 2021, Soleimani was also sanctioned by the Council of the European Union for his role in the violent response to the November 2019 protests.

On 7 December 2021, the U.S. Department of the Treasury added Soleimani to its Specially Designated Nationals (SDN) list "for having acted or purported to act for or on behalf of, directly or indirectly, the Basij". Individuals on the list have their assets blocked and U.S. persons are generally prohibited from dealing with them.

References

Living people
Islamic Revolutionary Guard Corps brigadier generals
Islamic Revolutionary Guard Corps personnel of the Iran–Iraq War
1964 births
Iranian individuals subject to the U.S. Department of the Treasury sanctions
Bakhtiari people
Specially Designated Nationals and Blocked Persons List